Snake Gorge, also called Wādī Bīmah, is a gorge or wadi in Ad Dakhiliyah region of Oman. It is popular with hikers. It is a fantastic route for jumping off small cliffs into water pools. There are also natural water slides. However, it is flash-flood prone, and in the 1996, a small group of hikers drowned. In 2014, 11 tourists from Dubai in the UAE were trapped during rains, but managed to survive on the rocks for 2 hours, despite losing their vehicle in the process. The Royal Oman Police and PACDA frequently try to prevent such tragedies by sending out weather warnings.

See also
 List of wadis of Oman

References

Further reading

External links

 Wadi Bani Awf Adventure | مغامرة وادي بني عوف (YouTube)

Canyons and gorges of Asia
Wadi Bani Awf